Glyphodella flavibrunnea is a moth in the family Crambidae. It was described by George Hampson in 1899. It is found in the Democratic Republic of the Congo (Maniema), Madagascar and South Africa (KwaZulu-Natal).

References

Moths described in 1899
Spilomelinae